The American Civil War was a civil war in the United States between the Union (states that remained loyal to the federal union, or "the North") and the Confederacy (states that voted to secede, or "the South"). While the total death toll of the war is not fully known, it is generally agreed that it resulted in at least 1,030,000 casualties (3 percent of the population), including about 620,000 soldier deaths—two-thirds by disease—and 50,000 civilians. Some experts, including Binghamton University historian J. David Hacker, believe the number of soldier deaths was at least 750,000, and possibly as high as 850,000. The Civil War remains the deadliest military conflict in American history.

During the first year of the war, both sides had many more volunteers than they had the time or resources to effectively train. However, this initial enthusiasm began to wane and both sides enacted conscription laws to amass more volunteers. In April 1862, the Confederacy passed a draft law aimed at men aged 18 to 35, with exemptions for overseers of slaves, government officials, and clergymen. Three months later, the United States Congress authorized state militias to draft from local populations when they couldn't met their quotas with volunteers. In total, the Union Army had 2,200,000 soldiers, including 698,000 at their peak. The Confederacy had 750,000 to 1,000,000 soldiers, with a peak of 360,000.

This list contains notable holders of political office who died as a result of their personal involvement in the Civil War, from both the Union and Confederate sides. Many of the politicians listed perished directly in battle, while others died because of the result of injuries sustained on the battlefield or smaller skirmishes, or as a result of the difficult circumstances they experienced as a soldier or prisoner of war. A few others were casualties of personal accidents or violence unrelated to battle. In addition to the offices they held and their allegiance during the war, this list also contains, when known, the politician's political party, profession, and circumstances surrounding their death.

Deaths

References

American Civil War
United States politicians killed during the Civil War